1944 in the Philippines details events of note that happened in the Philippines in the year 1944.

Incumbents

Philippine Commonwealth

 President:
 Manuel Quezon (Nacionalista Party) (until August 1)
 Sergio Osmeña (Nacionalista Party) (starting August 1)
 Vice President:
 Sergio Osmeña (Nacionalista Party) (until August 1)
 vacant (starting August 1)
 Chief Justice: José Yulo
 Philippine National Assembly: National Assembly (until February 2)

Second Philippine Republic
President: José P. Laurel 
Prime Minister: Jorge B. Vargas 
Vice President: Benigno Aquino, Sr. 
Chief Justice: José Yulo

Events

January
 January 8 – World War II: Philippine Commonwealth troops under the Philippine Commonwealth Army, Philippine Constabulary and the USAFIP-NL units enter the province of Ilocos Sur in northern Luzon and attack Japanese forces.

August
 August 1 – Sergio Osmena assumes the Office of the President of the Commonwealth of the Philippines after the death of Manuel Quezon.

September
 September 18 – Filipino forces under the 9th Samar Company of the Philippine Constabulary were ambushed at Barrio Cansumangkay in Balangiga, Samar and attack Japanese Imperial forces.
 September 21 – US forces raids Manila.
 September 26 – Tomoyuki Yamashita appointed as Japanese Military Governor (1944–1945).

October
 October 20:
 General MacArthur lands in Palo, Leyte, accompanied by President Sergio Osmena and US troops.
 American forces land on the beaches in Dulag, Leyte, the Philippines, accompanied by Filipino troops entering the town, and fiercely opposed by the Japanese occupation forces. The combined forces liberate Tacloban.
 October 23 – The Commonwealth government of the Philippines is re-established in Tacloban, Leyte.
 October 25 – The USS Samuel B Roberts ship goes down during a battle off the central island of Samar.

December
 December 8 – Pro-Japanese Philippine generals Pio Duran and Benigno Ramos organize the Makapilis.

Holidays

As per Act No. 2711 section 29, issued on March 10, 1917, any legal holiday of fixed date falls on Sunday, the next succeeding day shall be observed as legal holiday. Sundays are also considered legal religious holidays. Bonifacio Day was added through Philippine Legislature Act No. 2946. It was signed by then-Governor General Francis Burton Harrison in 1921. On October 28, 1931, the Act No. 3827 was approved declaring the last Sunday of August as National Heroes Day.

 January 1 – New Year's Day
 February 22 – Legal Holiday
 April 6 – Maundy Thursday
 April 7 – Good Friday
 May 1 – Labor Day
 July 4 – Philippine Republic Day
 August 13  – Legal Holiday
 August 27  – National Heroes Day
 November 23 – Thanksgiving Day
 November 30 – Bonifacio Day
 December 25 – Christmas Day
 December 30 – Rizal Day

Births
 January 19 – Robert Barbers, Filipino politician (d. 2005)
 January 23 – Mahar Mangahas, Economist
 February 7 – Eddie Gil, Filipino singer
 March 25 – Hermilando Mandanas, Filipino politician
 March 27 – Lydia Yu-Jose, political science professor (d. 2014)
 April 29 – Tingting Cojuangco, Filipino politician
 May 2 – Roberto Sebastian, businessman and philanthropist (d. 2012)
 May 22 – Roberto A. Abad, Filipino Lawyer and Judge
 June 23 – Silvestre Bello III, businessman, lawyer, and Secretary of Labor and Employment
 June 28 – Teresa Aquino-Oreta, Philippine senator (d. 2020)
 June 29 – Jose Alvarez, politician
 August 6 – Inday Badiday, host and journalist (d. 2003)
 September 19 – Carlos Padilla, Filipino politician 
 September 29 – Leopoldo S. Tumulak, bishop of Diocese of Tagbilaran (d. 2017)
 October 18 – Bomber Moran, actor (d. 2004)
 October 22 – Voltaire Gazmin, soldier and politician
 November 2 – Jun Factoran, lawyer, politician, and human rights activist (d. 2020)
 November 17 – Orlando Bauzon, Basketball player (d. 2020)
 December 4 – Ronaldo Zamora, Minority Leader
 December 11 – Ernesto Lariosa, Cebuano writer, poet, and columnist (d. 2019)

Deaths
 January – Bonifacio Mencias, Filipino physician, epidemiologist, guerrillasympathizer, and martyr.(born 1888)
 February 11 – José Ozámiz, Filipino politician (born 1898)
 August 1 – Manuel L. Quezon, Philippine president (born 1878)
 August 28 – Rafael R. Roces, Jr., Filipino journalist, writer, patriot, World War II spy, hero, and martyr. (born 1912)
 August 30 – Manuel Arguilla, Ilokano writer in English, patriot, and martyr. (born 1911)
 December 25 – Jacinto Ciria Cruz, Olympic Basketball player and coach
 December 31 – Vicente Lim, Filipino Brigadier General and hero during World War II (born 1888)

References